David Thomasberger (born 9 January 1996) is a German swimmer. He competed in the men's 200 metre butterfly at the 2019 World Aquatics Championships. He qualified to represent Germany at the 2020 Summer Olympics.

References

External links
 

1996 births
Living people
Place of birth missing (living people)
German male butterfly swimmers
Swimmers at the 2020 Summer Olympics
Olympic swimmers of Germany